Jeff Calhoun may refer to:
Jeff Calhoun (baseball)
Jeff Calhoun (director)